Martin Rodler (born 24 February 1989) is an Austrian footballer who plays for SV Lafnitz.

References

Soccerway.com profile

Austrian footballers
Austrian Football Bundesliga players
TSV Hartberg players
SV Mattersburg players
SV Lafnitz players
1989 births
Living people

Association football defenders